Natalee Scripps (born 9 December 1978) is a New Zealand former cricketer who played as a right-arm medium bowler. She appeared in 1 Test match and 7 One Day Internationals for New Zealand between 2003 and 2005. She played domestic cricket for Auckland.

References

External links
 
 

1978 births
Living people
Cricketers from Auckland
New Zealand women cricketers
New Zealand women Test cricketers
New Zealand women One Day International cricketers
Auckland Hearts cricketers